Alexeyevskoye is a rural locality (a selo) in Ivanovskoye Rural Settlement, Kovrovsky District, Vladimir Oblast, Russia. The population was 47 as of 2010.

Geography 
Alexeyevskoye is located 42 km southeast of Kovrov (the district's administrative centre) by road. Otrub is the nearest rural locality.

References 

Rural localities in Kovrovsky District